Baizuo (literally "white left") is a Chinese neologism used to refer to Western leftist ideologies primarily espoused by white people. The term baizuo is related to the term  (literally "Holy Mother"), a reference to those whose political opinions are perceived as being overly driven by emotion.

Definition 
"Baizuo" is a popular political epithet commonly used on the Chinese Internet. The literal translation is "white left" which derogatorily refers to western white leftists who advocate civil rights movement, environmentalism, feminism and multiculturalism. According to Chinese political scientist Chenchen Zhang, the word "Baizuo" refers to those who "only care about topics such as immigration, minorities, LGBT rights and the environment", but lack a concept of "real problems in the real world". It is also used to describe those "hypocritical humanitarians who advocate political correctness just to satisfy their own sense of moral superiority". Some used this word to indicate those "ignorant and arrogant westerners" who "pity the rest of the world and think they are saviours".

History
The term baizuo was apparently coined in a 2010 article published on Renren Network by user Li Shuo, entitled The Fake Morality of the Western White Left and the Chinese Patriotic Scientists, initially used as a general critique of certain socialist values in the American left. No further use of the term is known until 2013, where it enjoyed prominence in the Chinese forum Zhihu through 2013–2015.

Substantial use in Chinese Internet culture began in early 2016, at first at MIT BBS, a bulletin board system used by many Chinese Americans, during the 2016 United States presidential election. Baizuo was used there to criticize the Democratic Party's emphasis on the affirmative action policies perceived as discriminating against Asians.

This term also gained some attentions in Germany and is used  to criticize Angela Merkel's immigration policies.

The term has been referenced approvingly by American conservatives, including Tucker Carlson and Rod Dreher.

Similar terms in Hong Kong 

A different term was widely used for similar effect in Hong Kong, called zo gaau (literally "left dumbass" or "leftard"). The term gain popularity in HK in the 2010s, and became widespread after the  2014 Hong Kong protests.

See also 

 Boba liberal
 Gauche caviar
 Champagne socialist
 Liberal elite
 Limousine liberal
 Regressive left
 Social liberalism
 Virtue signalling
 Westsplaining
 White savior
 Woke

References 

Chinese Internet slang
Linguistic controversies
Political neologisms
Political slurs for people
Criticism of multiculturalism
Criticism of feminism
2010s neologisms